Destiny of the Republic: A Tale of Madness, Medicine and the Murder of a President is a 2011 book by Candice Millard covering the life and assassination of James A. Garfield, the 20th President of the United States. Published by Doubleday (an imprint of Knopf Doubleday Publishing Group, owned by Random House) on 20 September 2011, it later went on to win the Edgar Award for Best Fact Crime in 2012.

Critical reception
Millard's book received positive reviews upon publishing by organizations such as The New York Times, The Washington Times, and The Seattle Times.

Del Quentin Wilber of The Washington Post said of the book, "Millard has crafted a fresh narrative that plumbs some of the most dramatic days in U.S. presidential history."

Awards
The book went on to win the following awards:

 Edgar Award for Best Fact Crime (2012)
 Andrew Carnegie Medal Nominee for Nonfiction (2012)
 PEN Center USA award for Research Nonfiction
 One Book – One Lincoln Award

References

External links
Destiny of the Republic - on Goodreads.
Destiny of the Republic - excerpt from NPR.

2011 non-fiction books
Edgar Award-winning works
American history books
Books by Candice Millard
Doubleday (publisher) books